Gas-pak is a method used in the production of an anaerobic environment. It is used to culture bacteria which die or fail to grow in the presence of oxygen (anaerobes).

These are commercially available, disposable sachets containing a dry powder or pellets, which, when mixed with water and kept in an appropriately sized airtight jar, produce an atmosphere free of elemental oxygen gas (O2). They are used to produce an anaerobic culture in microbiology.

It is a much simpler technique than the McIntosh and Filde's anaerobic jar where one needs to pump gases in and out.

Constituents of gas-pak sachets
Sodium borohydride - NaBH4
Sodium bicarbonate - NaHCO3
Citric acid - C3H5O(COOH)3
Cobalt chloride - CoCl2 (catalyst)

The addition of a Dicot Catalyst may be required to initiate the reaction.

Reactions 
NaBH4 + 2 H2O = NaBO2 + 4 H2↑
C3H5O(COOH)3 + 3 NaHCO3 + [CoCl2] = C3H5O(COONa)3 + 3 CO2 + 3 H2 + [CoCl2]
2 H2 + O2 + [Catalyst] = 2 H2O + [Catalyst]

Consumption of oxygen 
These chemicals react with water to produce hydrogen and carbon dioxide along with sodium citrate (C3H5O(COONa)3) and water as byproducts . Again, hydrogen and oxygen reacting on a catalyst like Palladiumised alumina (supplied separately) combine to form water.

Culture method 
The medium, the gas-pak sachet (opened and with water added) and an indicator are placed in an air-tight gas jar which is incubated at the desired temperature. The indicator tells whether the environment was indeed oxygen free or not.

The chemical indicator generally used for this purpose is "chemical methylene blue solution" that since synthesis has never been exposed to elemental oxygen. It is colored deep blue on oxidation in presence of atmospheric oxygen in the jar, but will become colorless when oxygen is gone, and anaerobic conditions are achieved.

References 

Microbiology equipment